Trashcan Darlings were a band from Oslo. They described themselves as the pioneers of Glamour-Punk  and a mix of Ramones, Kiss, Sex Pistols and New York Dolls.

Band history
The band was founded by Chris Damien Doll and Strange? Gentle in 1995.
Their debut single "I Just Wanna Die (On A Chemical High)" was released in 1999. The same year they signed to a German record label (East Side Records). After that they toured through Germany, France and Austria.
Since 2000 they are also playing in Switzerland and the rest of Scandinavia.

In the summer of 2008 the band announced their retirement, after singer Strange? Gentle said he wanted to quit the band due to lack of inspiration. The rest of the band did not want to continue without Strange? and split up. Their last show was in Oslo on December 13, 2008.

Band Members
Current members
 Strange? Gentle – vocals
 Chris Damien Doll – guitar
 Frankie Nachtnebel – guitar
 Q. Ken Rockers – bass
 Andy Hunter – drums

Former members
 Dan Dee – bass
 Skinny Shotgun - drums
 Eric Carr - drums
 Birdy – guitar

Discography

Albums
 Episode I: The Lipstick Menace – LP (2002; East Side Records; Germany)
 Episode I: The Lipstick Menace – CD (2004; East Side Records; Germany)
 Episode I: The Lipstick Menace - CD (2005; Wizzard In Vinyl; Japan)
 Getting Away With Murder - CD (2006; East Side Records / StrangeDolls Records; Germany/Norway)
 Getting Away With Murder - PicLP (2007; East Side Records; Germany/Norway)

Singles
 "I Just Wanna Die (On A Chemical High)" -7” (1999; StrangeDolls Records; Norway)
 "Johnny Is A Drag-Queen" -7” (1999; Siri; Norway)
 "Gore Gore Boys And Splatter Pussies" -10” (2000; East Side Records; Germany)
 "Gore Gore Boys And Splatter Pussies" -MCD (2000; StrangeDolls Records; Norway)
 "Holiday In My Head" -EP (2001; East Side Records; Germany)
 "Trashcan Darlings / Silver -Split 7"(2002; StrangeDolls Records; Norway)
 Trashcan Darlings / The Revolvers -Split EP (2003; East Side Records; Germany)
 "Tunes From The Trashcan" -7"(2004; East Side Records; Germany)
 "Tunes From The Trashcan" -MCD (2004; StrangeDolls Records; Norway)

Compilations
 Real Fucking Make-Up -CD (2008; StrangeDolls Records; Norway)

DVD
 10 Years Of Trash - (2005; StrangeDolls Records; Norway)

References

Norwegian punk rock groups
Glam rock groups
Musical groups established in 1995
1995 establishments in Norway
Musical groups disestablished in 2008
2008 disestablishments in Norway
Musical groups from Oslo